New Barbadoes Township was a township that was formed in 1710 and existed in its largest extent in pre-American Revolutionary War times in Bergen County, New Jersey. The Township was created from territories that had been part of Essex County that were removed by royal decree and added to Bergen County. After many departures, secessions and deannexations over the centuries, New Barbadoes Township exists today as Hackensack, which adopted its present name in 1921.

The township was named for the English colony of Barbados. Soon after the English annexation of the Dutch province of New Netherland in 1664, Philip Cartaret, governor of what became the proprietary colony of East Jersey, granted land to Captain John Berry in the area known as Achter Kol He soon took up residence and called it "New Barbadoes", having previously resided on the Caribbean island. The original land patent encompassed area between the Hackensack River and the Saddle River. The early colonial owner is recalled in the name of a stream in the New Jersey Meadowlands, Berrys Creek, and the historic Yereance-Berry House.

As originally constituted, the Township included all of present-day Bergen County west of the Hackensack River, including portions beyond the Passaic River, and added the whole territory between the two rivers from Newark Bay once known  as New Barbadoes Neck (including the western part of present-day Hudson County), northward to the boundary with New York and west to the boundary line of Sussex County.

In 1716, Saddle River Township was created from all portions of New Barbadoes Township west of the Saddle River. New Barbadoes then consisted of all lands west of the Hackensack River and east of the Passaic and Saddle Rivers.

In 1775, Harrington Township was formed by royal charter from the northern portions of both New Barbadoes Township and Hackensack Township.

Lodi Township was formed in 1821 from the southern portion of New Barbadoes Township.

In 1871, Midland Township (now Rochelle Park) was created from the northern portions of New Barbadoes Township.

The Hackensack Commission was formed within New Barbadoes Township in 1868. New Barbadoes Township remained in existence until 1921 when it was replaced by the City of Hackensack.

Sources 
"History of Bergen County, New Jersey, 1630-1923;" by "Westervelt, Frances A. (Frances Augusta), 1858-1942."
"Municipal Incorporations of the State of New Jersey (according to Counties)" prepared by the Division of Local Government, Department of the Treasury (New Jersey); December 1, 1958.

References

External links
Bergen County Townships and Municipalities
Dutch Door Genealogy: Bergen County New Jersey Municipalities

Former townships in Bergen County, New Jersey